My Wife's Lodger is a 1952 British comedy film directed by Maurice Elvey and starring Dominic Roche, Olive Sloane and Leslie Dwyer. The screenplay concerns a soldier who returns home after the Second World War only to find a spiv lodger has established himself in his place. It was based on the play My Wife's Lodger written by Roche.

Cast
 Dominic Roche as Willie Higginbotham
 Olive Sloane as Maggie Higginbotham
 Leslie Dwyer as Roger the Lodger
 Diana Dors as Eunice Higginbotham
 Alan Sedgwick as Tex
 Vincent Dowling as Norman Higginbotham
 Vi Kaley as Mother-in-Law
 Martin Wyldeck as Policeman
 David Hannaford as Vernon
 Ilena Sylva as Vernon's Mother
 Ronald Adam as Doctor
 Wally Patch as Sergeant
 Derek Tansley  as Deserter
 Alastair Hunter as Lance Corporal
 Toke Townley as Soldier
 Fred Griffiths as Driver
 Harry Locke as Passer-by

Production
The film was based on a 1951 play.

Filming took place in May 1952. Dors was appearing in a revue Rendezvous at night It was one of a series of low budget comedies Dors made around this time.

Critical reception
The Monthly Film Bulletin said "this comedy runs through a repertoire of farcical situations of the most ancient variety. The playing does not lack energy but the music-hall style jokes - domestic bickering, mothers-in-law and so on - become very exhausting."

TV Guide wrote, "the energy of the ensemble partly makes up for the film's lack of coherence and taste." The 'Daily Film Renter' (quoted in BFI Screenonline) wrote, "the acting is of the 'Ee-bai-goom' school and the dialogue is the ripe, uninhibited language of the music hall... as briny as jellied eels on Southend Pier." In 'CathodeRayTube.co.uk', Frank Collins writes, "there are some genuinely laugh out loud moments here and the humour derived from the antics of such a dysfunctional family reflect many of the tropes that would find their way into British sitcoms of the late 1960s and 1970s where other ideological wars would be fought - based on gender, class, race and religion."

References

External links

 My Wife's Lodger at BFI Screenonline
My Wife's Lodger at Letterbox DVD
My Wife's Lodger at Reel Streets
My Wife's Lodger at BFI

1952 films
1950s English-language films
Films directed by Maurice Elvey
1952 comedy films
British comedy films
British black-and-white films
1950s British films